KNNB (88.1 FM) is a public radio station in Whiteriver, Arizona.  It primarily features local programming for the Apache Native American community, plus networked programming from National Public Radio and Native Voice One.

External links
 KNNB reference

NPR member stations
NNB
Native American radio
Apache culture